The Biological Dynamics of Forest Fragments Project Area of Relevant Ecological Interest (: ARIE-PDBFF) is an area of relevant ecological interest in the state of Amazonas, Brazil.
It is the location of the Biological Dynamics of Forest Fragments Project, which explores the effects of habitat fragmentation and the processes of regeneration of forest fragments isolated by human activity.

Location

The Rio Urubu State Forest lies to the north. 
The BR-174 highway divides the ARIE, which is mostly on the east of the highway. Two small segments are on the west side of the highway in the Rio Negro Left Bank Environmental Protection Area.

The ARIE-PDBFF includes a total of 23 nature reserves in 11 forest fragments, including isolated reserves surrounded by pasture or secondary growth and non-isolated areas that are still part of large tracts of continuous forest.
There are seven camps in the ARIE, each with sleeping areas, laboratory, kitchen and toilets.

History

The Biological Dynamics of Forest Fragments Project began its research in 1979.
The Biological Dynamics of Forest Fragments Project Area of Relevant Ecological Interest was created by federal decree 91.884 of 5 November 1985.
The ARIE is managed by the Chico Mendes Institute for Biodiversity Conservation (ICMBio) in cooperation with the National Institute of Amazonian Research and the Smithsonian Institution of the United States.
Only scientific research is allowed.
The ARIE became part of the Central Amazon Ecological Corridor, created in 2002.
The consultative council was created on 21 July 2015.

Environment

The terrain consists of plateaus cut by small stream and creeks that form flooded areas in some parts.

The local landscape includes protected areas and several areas of pasture, either in use or abandoned and in various stages of regeneration.
This provides a unique opportunity to study the forest regeneration process.
56 families of trees have been identified with over 1000 species.
Animal species include frogs (51), lizards (24), snakes (63), birds (370) and mammals (52).

Notes

Sources

Areas of relevant ecological interest of Brazil
Protected areas of Amazonas (Brazilian state)
1985 establishments in Brazil